Spiders on a Web is a 1900 British short  silent documentary film, directed by George Albert Smith, featuring a single shot close-up of two spiders trapped in an enclosure (not on a web as indicated in the title). The film is, according to Michael Brooke of BFI Screenonline, "less formally ambitious," than the director's, "groundbreaking multiple close-up study Grandma's Reading Glass (1900), made the same year, but is nonetheless, "one of the earliest British examples of close-up natural history photography, predating Percy Smith's insect studies by a decade."

References

External links 
 Spiders on a Web on screenonline.org.uk
 Spiders on a Web on wildfilmhistory.org (direct link)

1900 films
1900s British films
British silent short films
1900s short documentary films
Black-and-white documentary films
Films about spiders
Films directed by George Albert Smith
British black-and-white films
British short documentary films